Linda Muri (born 4 January 1963) is an American rower. In the 1994 and 1995 World Rowing Championships, she won gold medals in the women's lightweight coxless four event.

References

1963 births
American female rowers
World Rowing Championships medalists for the United States
Living people
Pan American Games medalists in rowing
Pan American Games silver medalists for the United States
Rowers at the 1991 Pan American Games
21st-century American women